Witley Common is an area of woodland and heath, close to Witley, Surrey, in the United Kingdom. It is part of a much larger Site of Special Scientific Interest.

The land has been occupied since the Bronze Age — it features ancient burial mounds which have been dated to this period. It has been used as common land by many generations over the centuries — particularly for grazing, turf-cutting and, during the 16th and 17th centuries, for iron workings.

Witley Common again proved useful during the First and Second World Wars when the land was used by the army as a training camp (Witley Camp) with up to 20,000 soldiers based there at one point. In the late 1940s, it was gradually restored to its pre-war condition.

Today it is managed by the National Trust, to provide a mixture of habitats for wildlife, with birch, oak and pine woodland, as well as open heathland. Birdlife includes nightjars and nightingales. The area is populated by many rare species and has a broad range of both deciduous and evergreen varieties of trees. The area is a water catchment for the upper reaches of the River Wey.

Witley Centre
Witley Common contains a nature information centre, known as The Witley Centre, built and managed by the National Trust. The centre features a countryside exhibition. The centre often hosts school groups and children's holiday activities.

External links
Surrey County Council
Ornithologist review
Photo
information at the National Trust

Sites of Special Scientific Interest in Surrey
National Trust properties in Surrey